Evangel University, Akaeze (EUA) is a private Christian university in Ebonyi state. It is owned by the Assemblies of God Christian denomination. The university was licensed in February, 2012 and commenced academic activities on 27 November 2012 for the 2012/2013 academic session. The university began operation at its take-off campus in Okpoto with two colleges and one school. It has since been extended to four colleges while work is ongoing in view of a planned move to its permanent campus at Akaeze. Full accreditation was obtained from the National Universities Commission, NUC in 2016. The school is one of Nigeria's least expensive private universities. A 2016 survey report by  Economic Confidential  described Evangel University as one of the less popular destinations for students seeking admission to higher institutions.

Location
The takeoff campus of Evangel University is located at Okpoto, 48 Km east of Enugu along Enugu-Abakaliki Expressway (Highway A341) in  Ebonyi State, Nigeria.

The main campus is under construction at Akaeze, Ebonyi state at the previously disputed Igboro section which lies between Ivo local government and Afikpo south local government.

Constituent Colleges
There are four colleges and one school 
 College of Management Sciences
 College of Health Sciences
 College of Science
 College of Arts
 College of Social Sciences
 School of General Studies

References

Universities and colleges in Nigeria